Ohenri is a genus of braconid wasps in the family Braconidae. There is at least one described species in Ohenri, O. gouletorum, found in Nigeria.

The name honours Dr Henri Goulet.

References

Microgastrinae